The High Council of State was the supreme political body of Mauritania. It served as the country's interim government following the coup d'état which ousted the President, Sidi Ould Cheikh Abdallahi on August 6, 2008. It was led by General Mohamed Ould Abdel Aziz. After seizing power it quickly pledged to hold elections "in the shortest possible period". A few days after seizing power, Abdel Aziz named Mauritanian Ambassador to Belgium and the European Union, Moulaye Ould Mohamed Laghdaf, as Prime Minister.

On April 15, 2009 Ould Abdel Aziz resigned as President of the High Council of State in order to stand as a candidate in the upcoming presidential election. President of the Senate, Ba Mamadou Mbaré, succeeded him as head of state in an interim capacity, becoming the first black leader of Mauritania. The election took place on July 18, 2009 and Abdel Aziz was elected President with 52.58% of the votes. He was sworn in on August 5, 2009.

Members

 Gen. Mohamed Ould Abdel Aziz, Chairman
 Gen. Mohamed Ould Ghazouani
 Gen. Felix Negré
 Col. Ahmed Ould Bekrine
 Col. Mohamed Ould Cheikh Ould El Hadi
 Col. Ghoulam Ould Mahmoud
 Col. Mohamed Ould Meguet
 Col. Mohamed Ould Mohamed Znagui
 Col. Dia Adama Oumar
 Col. Hanena Ould Sidi
 Col. Ahmedou Bemba Ould Baye

See also 
 Military Committee for National Recovery (CRMN) – Military government in 1978–79.
 Military Committee for National Salvation (CMSN) – Military government in 1979–92.
 Military Council for Justice and Democracy (CMJD) – Military government in 2005–07.

References

History of Mauritania
Politics of Mauritania
Government of Mauritania
Mauritania